The 1934 Barcelona City Council election was held on Sunday, 14 January 1934, to elect the Barcelona City Council, the unicameral local legislature of the municipality of Barcelona, together with the other 1,029 Catalan municipalities. At stake were all 40 seats in the City Council, determining the Mayor of Barcelona. These were the first local elections where women were able to vote.

Electoral system
According to the 1932 Statute of Autonomy, the competences on local elections were devolved to the Catalan Government. The electoral system was determined by the Municipal Law. The number of seats in the Barcelona City Council consisted of 40 members.

All City Council members were elected in a single multi-member district, consisting of the Barcelona municipality, using closed lists party block voting: the winning party in number of votes would win the 66% of the seats, the second party would win the 66% of the unfilled seats, and so on. Voting was on the basis of universal suffrage in a secret ballot.

Results

Results by district

Councillors elected
Catalan Left (ERC-USC-ACR-PNRE)
Carles Pi Sunyer (ERC)
Jaume Serra Húnter (ERC)
Estanislau Duran Reinals(ACR)
Antoni Ventós Casadevall (ERC)
Antoni Vilalta Vidal (PNRE)
Marià Martínez Cuenca (USC)
Jaume Vàchier Pallé (ERC)
Josep Escofet Andreu (ERC)
Ferran Boter Mauri (ACR)
Francesc Carbonell Vila (ERC)
Hilari Salvadó Castell (ERC)
Vicenç Bernades Biusà (ERC)
Domènec Pla Blanco (ERC)
Emili Granier Barrera (USC)
Josep Gispert Vila (ERC)
Francesc Godó i Roc (ERC)
Tomàs Pumarola Julià (ACR)
Ot Hurtado i Martí (ACR)
Benet Mori i Ballester (ERC)
Antoni Oliva i Oliva (ERC)
Ricard Altaba i Planuc (PNRE)
Francesc Rosell i Montaner (USC)
Joan Codomí i Pujolar (ERC)
Josep Maria Masip i Izàbal (ERC)
Ramon Junyent i Vila (ERC)
Cristià Cortés i Lladó (ERC)
Catalan League (LC)
Lluís Duran Ventosa
Josep Codolà Gualdo
Frederic Roda Ventura
Octavi Saltor Soler
Xavier Calderó Coronas
Andreu Bausili Sanromà
Francesc Vendrell Tiana
Francesc de Sagarra de Castellarnau
Joan Soler Janer
Josep Maria Blanc Romeu
Radical Republican Party (PRR)
Luis Matutano Casanovas
José Matheu Ferrer
Pedro Domènech Seriñana
Federico Frigola Palau

References

1934
1930s in Barcelona
1934 in Catalonia
January 1934 events